Nicolas Ray (born 14 May 1981 in Vichy) is a French politician. He was elected deputy for Allier's 3rd constituency
in the 2022 French legislative election, representing the Republicans.

Biography

Youth and studies 
Nicolas Ray graduated from the Paris Institute of Political Studies, where he specialized in economics and public law.

Professionnal career 
He also practiced at the cash in Vic-sur-Cère, in Cantal.

In 2001, he appeared on the list of outgoing mayor Joseph Bléthon at the Cusset Municipal Council. He joined the UMP in 2003.

Nicolas Ray has been a municipal councillor of Bellerive-sur-Allier since 2014.

In 2017, he was the substitute of the (LR) candidate  Gabriel Maquin for Allier's 3rd constituency.

On April 3, 2022, he announced, in Gannat, his candidacy for the legislative elections, again in Allier's 3rd constituency.

He was elected on June 19, 2022, with the Les Républicains label, against Bénédicte Peyrol, the outgoing deputy (LREM). He came first in 87 of the 88 municipalities in the constituency.

References

External links

 His page on the site of the National Assembly

Deputies of the 16th National Assembly of the French Fifth Republic
Living people
1981 births
The Republicans (France) politicians
21st-century French politicians